Coñocranra (possibly from Quechua quñuq warm, lukewarm, ranra stony, stony place) is a mountain of Peru located in the Ancash Region, Santa Province. It is the highest mountain in the Cordillera Negra at (5181 m).

From its summit is the scenery of the Andes mountain range around. To the west, is the profile of the coast, usually in a misty background. To the east, is the Cordillera Blanca where the highest peaks of  Peru can be seen, especially Huascarán (6768 m). Between the two mountain ranges, runs the Santa River, which gives life to the Callejón de Huaylas. Then the two mountain ranges come close to giving birth to the Canyon del Pato. Finally the Santa River, after cutting the Cordillera Negra, flows into the Pacific Ocean.

References 

Mountains of Peru
Mountains of Ancash Region